John Richardson (born 28 July 1966) is an English former footballer who played in the Football League as a forward for Colchester United.

Career

Born in Durham, Richardson signed for Third Division side Colchester United from Chesham United in September 1993 on a non-contract basis. He made his Football League debut on 25 September 1993, coming on as a substitute for player-manager Roy McDonough in a 4–1 win over Bury at Layer Road. He failed to score in any of his eight league games for Colchester, making his final appearance in a 4–2 home defeat to Crewe Alexandra on 11 December 1993, replacing Steve Ball. Richardson returned to non-league football with Chesham following his release.

References

External links
John Richardson at coludata.co.uk

1966 births
Living people
Sportspeople from Durham, England
Footballers from County Durham
English footballers
Association football forwards
Chesham United F.C. players
Colchester United F.C. players
English Football League players